A community is a division of land in Wales that forms the lowest tier of local government in Wales. Welsh communities are analogous to civil parishes in England. There are 878 communities in Wales.

History 
Until 1974 Wales was divided into civil parishes. These were abolished by section 20 (6) of the Local Government Act 1972, and replaced by communities by section 27 of the same Act. The principal areas of Wales are divided entirely into communities. Unlike in England, where unparished areas exist, no part of Wales is outside a community, even in urban areas.

Most, but not all, communities are administered by community councils, which are equivalent to English parish councils in terms of their powers and the way they operate. Welsh community councils may call themselves town councils unilaterally and may have city status granted by the Crown. In Wales, all town councils are community councils. There are now three communities with city status: Bangor, St Asaph and St Davids. The chair of a town council or city council will usually have the title mayor (Welsh: maer). However, not every community has a council. In communities with populations too small to sustain a full community council, community meetings may be established. The communities in the urban areas of the cities of Cardiff, Swansea and Newport do not have community councils.

As of the 2001 United Kingdom census, there were 869 communities in Wales. 84 percent, or more than 730, have a council. They ranged in population from Barry with 45,053 recorded inhabitants to Baglan Bay with no permanent residents.

The twenty-two principal area councils are required to review the community boundaries within their area every fifteen years. The councils propose changes to the Local Democracy and Boundary Commission for Wales, which prepares a report and makes recommendations to the Welsh Government. If the Welsh Government accepts the recommendations, then it implements them using a statutory instrument. For example, in 2016 four new communities were created in the City and County of Cardiff.

The legislation surrounding community councils in Wales has been amended significantly in the Local Government (Wales) Act 1994 and the Local Government (Wales) Measure 2011.

See also
List of communities in Wales
Community councils
Wards of the United Kingdom

References

Sources

Further reading
 

 Communities
Types of subdivision in the United Kingdom